Megachile integrella is a species of bee in the family Megachilidae. It was described by Mitchell in 1926.

References

Integrella
Insects described in 1926